Christmas in Washington was an annual Christmas television special that originated on NBC and later aired on the TNT network.  It ended in 2015 after a 33-year run.

Background
One of two annual holiday specials produced by George Stevens Jr. (the other being the Kennedy Center Honors), the variety show first aired in 1982 on NBC before moving to its most recent home on TNT in 1998. Recorded in Washington, D.C. at the National Building Museum, on the second Sunday of each December before being re-edited for later broadcast, Christmas in Washington is a one-hour concert featuring artists from musical genres.  Each guest performs at least one solo, but the prominent marquee performer usually has one or two more songs.  The show sometimes had at least one guest from the world of opera.  Each of the musical performances are backed by a full orchestra and chorus.  The show's finale consisted of a medley performed by all the musical guests before the attendees-of-honor, the President of the United States and the First Lady, make a closing statement followed by the singing of "Hark! the Herald Angels Sing".

Recent events have benefited Children's National Medical Center.

Host and performers
From 2004 to 2008, the show was hosted by Dr. Phil and his wife, Robin. However, since 2009 and for the remainder of its most recent run, the show had a single host.  The 2013 edition featured Hugh Jackman as host and  The Backstreet Boys as marquee performers, marking the first time in six years that a group has been featured as marquee performers. The show aired live on pay-per-view internationally and in most major cities, after which a re-edited 42-minute version (with commercials in a one-hour slot) aired on network television.

Cancellation
In 2015, shortly after the Stevens' production company sold the rights to their companion program, the Kennedy Center Honors, the special was cancelled after being unable to find a new network or presenting sponsor (TNT had declined to renew the show after the 2014 edition).

Editions
The marquee performer is marked in bold.

References 

Source: for Christmas in Washington 2000: https://www.imdb.com/title/tt0271434/

Christmas television specials
1981 establishments in Washington, D.C.
2015 disestablishments in Washington, D.C.